Shrug were a three-piece alternative rock band from Northern Ireland formed by students Gary Lightbody, Mark McClelland, and Michael Morrison in September 1994 while in their first year at the University of Dundee.

History
Shrug formed following a couple of casual Friday night jam sessions in McClelland's girlfriend's room in Belmont Halls of Residence, the band decided to take things more seriously and began regular practices at "Stage 2000" rehearsal studios next to Dundee railway station.

Their live debut took place within a matter of weeks at Dundee University Students' Association (DUSA), attracting a considerable crowd and receiving very positive reviews. The following is an excerpt from "MacDougal", the DUSA newsletter (Christmas 1994 edition):

The band continued rehearsals during their Christmas break at Morrison's family home in Belfast. Using equipment borrowed from The Dominoes (Morrison's father Bill Morrison's band), Shrug gained more live experience playing at local venues such as The Duke of York, The Front Page, Robinsons and The Bear in Holywood.

On their return to Dundee they promptly recorded their first self funded demo, "The Yogurt vs Yoghurt Debate", recouping some of the costs through sales to fellow students and sending copies out to an array of record labels across the country. Approximately 250 of these tapes were put together at the time, with cover artwork designed by Colin Maguire and an inner insert added by the band.

Shrug continued to play gigs in and around Dundee and Belfast during 1995, and they came to the attention of Jeepster records in London. They signed a five-year management contract with Jeepster who then set about trying to get record company interest from some of the major labels. Also signed to Jeepster around this time was "Rhode Island", a Scottish act who would soon change their name to "Belle and Sebastian".

With help from Jeepster, Shrug recorded two further demo tapes in 1995 and 1996, including an early version of what would become Snow Patrol's first single release, "Starfighter Pilot". Unlike the previous tape, however, these were not sold but instead were distributed to record companies such as Sony Music Entertainment and Geffen Records. In addition, they began to play more high-profile gigs across Scotland and Northern Ireland. The band played a few gigs with another Northern Irish band, "Disraeli Gears", and Lightbody befriended their front man Paul Archer, his brother Iain Archer and drummer Jonny Quinn.

Transition to Snow Patrol
Around November 1996, as record company interest continued to grow, the band changed their name to Polar Bear to avoid potential legal complications with an American band that had claimed the name Shrug. A month later, Morrison suffered a breakdown. Richard Colburn from Belle and Sebastian filled in on drums until Jonny Quinn upped sticks, moving from Belfast to take Morrison's place in the band in Dundee. The band's first commercial release, "Starfighter Pilot" followed a few months later, and by 1998 they would be known as Snow Patrol.

Recordings
The Yogurt Vs. Yoghurt Debate (1995)

Untitled demo 1 (1995)

Untitled demo 2 (1996)

Band members
 Gary Lightbody – lead vocals, guitar
 Mark McClelland – bass guitar
 Michael Morrison – drums

References

Alternative rock groups from Northern Ireland
British musical trios
Musical groups established in 1994
Musical groups disestablished in 1996
Snow Patrol